Matsuda Yuriko (born 1943) is a Japanese ceramic artist.

Early life 
Yuriko was born in a city in Hyōgo Prefecture called Ashiya, Japan. She received her B.A and graduate degree in ceramics at Kyoto City University of Arts. Her professor at the time was Kenkichi Tomimoto, who was a famous potter during post-war Japan.

Work and accomplishments 
Matsuda Yuriko was a visiting artist in the exhibition Soaring Voices, which focused on female Japanese ceramic artists. Her work is in The Brooklyn Museum, the Yale University Art Gallery, the Spencer Museum of Art at the University of Kansas, the San Antonio Museum of Art, and the University of Hawaii Art Gallery, among others.

Soaring Voices 
Soaring voices was a moving exhibition that traveled from Japan, France, and to North America. It primarily focused on ceramic works made by female Japanese artists, which included Matsuda Yuriko. The exhibition was a response towards Japan's history of masculine ceramic arts. This is why the works made by the women in this exhibition include nature motifs as well as concepts of light and shadow.

Themes and influences 

Matsuda’s work is often centered on female body shapes, painted with bright colors, and hand-built. Her forms are irregular and playful, often dealing with themes of parody and exaggeration. Her works range from ceramic feet, teapots mounted with bananas, irregular vessels decorated with eggplants, ceramic buttocks, bell pepper forms, and roller skates, all handcrafted and colorfully painted. Her work shares elements with Dadaism, sharing playful elements with Man Ray and Elsa Schiaparelli. It often depicts decorations in red enamel with gold kinrande detailing, in the style of Imari porcelain export wares. Matsuda’s work subverts the traditional Japanese uses of colored glazes and gold patterning by applying them to a pair of porcelain feet, mounted on wooden blocks. Her work is not designed for strict functionality. Rather, they diverge from witty cultural commentary to self-expression.

This break from tradition may be linked to the exclusion of women from the ceramic arts in Japan. Despite Japan’s long history of ceramic arts, Matsuda’s work may be read as springing from post-war alternatives and away from Japan's traditional, masculine forms and its androcentric apprentice system. As women studied ceramics in universities, they broke from the traditional apprentice system, which primarily focused on functional vessels. However, women were still relegated to the outskirts of ceramic production, such as adding decorations and glazes. In extreme cases, other women couldn't fathom to use a kiln, but rather be seen as a support beam for their male counterparts. Before and during World War II, Women remained on the periphery of the ceramic world until the further development of post-war materials and the increasingly common education from universities as well as normalized appearance of gas and electric kiln. After World War II, Japanese ceramic work shifted in more sculptural, experimental, and expressive directions.

Public Collections 
 Yamanashi Museum of Art
 Takamatsu City museum
 The Shigaraki Ceramic Cultural Park
 Museum of Modern Ceramic Art, Gifu
 National Museum of History, Taiwan
 Barcelona Ceramic Museum, Spain
 Icheon World Ceramic Center, Korea
 Denver Museum of Art, Colorado
 Spencer Museum of Art, Kansas
 Yale University Art Gallery, Connecticut
 Hawaii State Art Foundation
 Minneapolis Institute of Arts, Minnesota
 Seattle Art Museum, Washington
 The Brooklyn Museum, New York

References 

1943 births
Living people
20th-century Japanese women artists
20th-century Japanese artists
21st-century Japanese women artists
21st-century Japanese artists
Japanese ceramists
Japanese women ceramists